Berthold-Georg Englert (born 1953) is Provost's Chair Professor at the National University of Singapore, and Principal Investigator at the Centre for Quantum Technologies.  In 2006, he was recognized for outstanding contributions to theoretical research on quantum coherence.  B.-G. Englert's principal research interests concern applications in quantum information science, but he is also known for his early work on quantum optics together with Marlan Scully at Texas A&M University.

Englert was American Physical Society Outstanding Referee in 2008, and is the Scientific Secretary of the Julian Schwinger Foundation.

Graduate and post-graduate education 
Englert obtained his Ph.D. in Physics from the University of Tübingen in 1981.  He did post-doctoral research at the Ludwig Maximilian University of Munich and obtained his Dr. rer. nat. habil. in 1990.

Selected publications 
Englert is the author of more than 160 publications in the fields of atomic, molecular and optical physics.

He published Symbolism of Atomic Measurements by Julian Schwinger (Springer Publishing, 2001) which is authoritative in the field of quantum mechanics.

See also
 Englert–Greenberger duality relation

References

External links
 Berthold-Georg Englert's homepage at the National University of Singapore

Living people
20th-century German physicists
Quantum physicists
Ludwig Maximilian University of Munich alumni
German science writers
Academic staff of the National University of Singapore
Theoretical physicists
1953 births
German male non-fiction writers
21st-century German physicists